Wayne Levell Cage (born November 23, 1951) is an American former professional baseball player. In 1971, he was drafted by the Cleveland Indians. Instead, a week after the trade, Cage's contract was sold to the Hankyu Braves of the Pacific League.

External links

1951 births
Living people
Major League Baseball designated hitters
Major League Baseball first basemen
Baseball players from Louisiana
Cleveland Indians players
American expatriate baseball players in Japan
Hankyu Braves players
Sportspeople from Monroe, Louisiana
African-American baseball players
21st-century African-American people
20th-century African-American sportspeople
Gulf Coast Indians players
Key West Conchs players
American expatriate baseball players in Mexico
Leones de Yucatán players
Portland Beavers players
Reno Silver Sox players
Rojos del Águila de Veracruz players
San Antonio Brewers players
San Jose Bees players
Tacoma Tigers players
Tacoma Tugs players
Toledo Mud Hens players
Williamsport Tomahawks players
Ruston High School alumni